Atomically precise manufacturing (APM) is an application of nanotechnology where single molecules can be used to manufacture products at an atomic level. The technology currently has potential in highly technical fields like quantum computing, but if commercialized, it would likely have a major impact across all fields of manufacturing. APM is classified as a disruptive technology, or a technology that creates large amounts of change in an existing industry.

APM is currently under development, and no easy method to manipulate individual atoms has been discovered. If advancements are made that make the technology cheap and efficient, APM could be commercialized for large-scale usage. As a disruptive technology, APM could first be marketed in niche fields such as nanomedicine and quantum computing before seeing widespread use.

Advantages of atomically precise manufacturing 
Traditional manufacturing processes are mainly based on the concepts of discrete manufacturing and process manufacturing. Atomically precise manufacturing offers a higher level of precision than traditional manufacturing, making it a potentially important technology in fields such as nanoplasmonic devices for quantum computing and technology, where even slight errors can have significant impacts on the final result.

Potential Applications

Environmental 
By operating at the atomic level, the efficiency of manufacturing can be greatly increased and waste can be exponentially decreased because manufacturers could have almost complete control over every aspect of the manufacturing process.

APM also has the potential to help with the widespread implementation of renewable energy sources. For example, APM has the potential to greatly increase the productivity of photovoltaic systems. Currently, photovoltaic (PV) systems are too costly for the amount of energy they produce to be used as a primary method of generating energy for large urban areas. The hope is that APM will allow PV systems to be created from cheaper, more common materials and eventually allow us to phase out fossil fuels as the primary form of energy generation.

Moreover, APM could make carbon capture and storage systems more accessible.

Quantum computing 
Currently, quantum computing is limited because quantum computers are affected by a wide variety of issues such as decoherence (the loss of the quantum nature of a particle) and, under these conditions, can struggle to perform basic functions correctly. In normal computers, issues of poor computing can usually be solved by providing more storage to the computer, but this is currently not a feasible option for quantum computers. The unit of storage for quantum computing is a "qubit," short for a "quantum bit," as opposed to a normal bit in standard computing. Researchers have to be highly conservative in their allocation of qubits because, unlike a typical computer that holds hundreds of billions of bits, the best quantum computers have around 50 qubits. Since the supply of information storage is in such short supply, researchers have been unable to find a way to divide qubits between error correction programs and the actual computation.

With the application of APM, researchers hope to be able to build quantum computers with larger storage modules as well as components that can maintain a coherent state indefinitely. Once these limitations have been overcome, quantum computers can begin to see their commercial applications.

Room-temperature superconductors 
A room-temperature superconductor is a substance that possesses the property of superconductivity at temperatures that could be considered 'room temperatures' (above 0°C). Room-temperature superconductors have been a heavily sought-after technology due to the potential they hold to greatly increase energy efficiency. Usually, superconductors can only function in cryogenic environments, and development of a room-temperature superconductor has been unsuccessful. The report about the first room temperature (15°C) superconductor H2S + CH4 in 2020 is not reliable (retracted).

To create superconductors that can function at room temperature and pressure, scientists are turning to APM to modify substances to behave differently.

Methods

Scanning tunneling microscope 
A current prospective method for fabricating atomically precise (AP) goods is under development, and there is a plan to use a scanning tunneling microscope (STM) to move individual atoms. Typically, an STM is used to photograph atoms and molecules, but STMs have been converted into machines with the required precision to position specific atoms. However, they are not efficient enough to be employed in large-scale manufacturing processes. The current goal is to advance the design of STMs to the point where a large group of them can fabricate goods in industrial settings.

In order to have multiple scanning tunneling microscopes operate together, an extreme level of coordination and exactness is required. A major level of precision is provided by nanopositioners (stages that position microscope samples to accuracies of within a nanometer) which allow for exact positioning on the x, y, and z axes. Once the nanopositioners are ready, the manufacturing process can begin.

The first step in the procedure is to construct a series of coordinated STM manufacturing devices that can work together efficiently and can handle the production of a large volume of product.

After this, a feedback-controlled microelectromechanical system (MEMS) will be implemented into the STMs that will allow them to operate independently of human supervision. The incorporation of the MEMS will allow the STMs to operate with anywhere from 100 to 1000 times more speed than before and with accuracy to within a nanometer, allowing for commercial usage.

Hydrogen lithography 
Hydrogen lithography is a method of APM revolving specifically around data storage. A team of researchers at the University of Alberta has used hydrogen lithography to store data at a density of 1.2 petabits (150,000 gigabytes) per square inch, making this form of data storage about 100 times as dense as a Blu-Ray disc. The technology works by using an STM to move hydrogen atoms around on a silicon substrate to store information in binary as ones and zeroes. The presence of a hydrogen atom in one location signifies a one, and the absence of a hydrogen atom in another location signifies a zero.

This technology represents a major leap forward from previous iterations of high-density storage devices that only functioned under ultra-specific conditions, such as at subzero temperatures or in a vacuum, making them highly impractical. The new storage method that uses hydrogen lithography is stable at room temperature and at standard atmospheric pressure. The technology is also long-lasting and able to store information for more than half a century.

Hydrogen depassivation lithography 
Hydrogen depassivation lithography (HDL) is a variant of electron beam lithography where the tip of a scanning tunneling microscope is modified to emit a cold field that fires a minuscule beam of electrons at a surface covered with a film sensitive to electrons called a resist, typically made of silicon. The beam of electrons can then be manipulated to etch designs or patterns on the resist. HDL is performed in vacuums with temperatures ranging from subzero to around 250°C. Currently, HDL can be carried out in one of two forms: up to five volts of power to create atomically precise patterns, or an 8-volt mode with a wider area of effect. Once a design has been made, the result is developed through the process of desorption. Desorption is the opposite of absorption, where a material separates from a surface instead of being enveloped by it. In HDL, the energy released when the electrons strike the surface of the silicon resist is enough to break the chemical bond between the silicon and hydrogen atoms, and the hydrogen atom ends up being desorbed.

The five-volt method has the accuracy to measure distances of under a nanometer but is relatively inefficient. A model that proves this method is atomically precise has been created, as shown in the formula:

Criticisms and controversies 
A variety of concerns have been raised about the potential risks the widespread use of APM could create.

Gray goo 
APM could contribute to the "gray goo" doomsday scenario wherein self-replicating molecular assemblers (machines that exist at the atomic scale) uncontrollably create copies of themselves, forming a gray goo that consumes the entire planet as a resource to continue replication. However, such a scenario is highly improbable. Not only would these molecular assemblers have to be purposely built for the function of creating gray goo, but developing these assemblers would take an extraordinary amount of resources. There is no evidence that anyone is actively working towards creating gray goo using APM, they likely don't have the resources to accomplish this goal.

Economic 
Another major issue with APM is the negative effect it could have on employment. By nature, APM is a very technologically complex medium and will require highly educated operators to be carried out. Some experts have raised concerns that APM's complexity may require specialized skills, which could lead to income disparities and affect employment opportunities.

Militarism 
APM could be used to develop novel, destructive weapons and spark another global Cold War. By making destructive weapons cheaper, countries may more likely to engage in violence as well.

Potential privacy risks 
Governments and security agencies may use APM to manufacture tiny cameras and other spyware in order to spy on citizens. There are concerns about the infringement of rights that may come with this type of technology.

See also

Drexler–Smalley debate on molecular nanotechnology
Nanotechnology
Molecular machine
Molecular assembler

References

Nanotechnology
Manufacturing
Molecular machines
Emerging technologies